Sahid Kshudiram Mahavidyalaya, established in 1996, is general degree college in Kamakhyaguri. It is in Alipurduar district. It offers undergraduate courses in arts. It is affiliated to  University of North Bengal. Netaji Open University also available here for master's degree.

Departments

Arts
Bengali
English
History
Geography
Political Science
Philosophy

See also

References

External links
Sahid Kshudiram Mahavidyalaya
University of North Bengal
University Grants Commission
National Assessment and Accreditation Council

Universities and colleges in Alipurduar district
Colleges affiliated to University of North Bengal
Educational institutions established in 1996
1996 establishments in West Bengal